Hamzeh Jihad Salameh (born 3 May 1986) is a Lebanese footballer who plays as a defensive midfielder for  club Safa.

Club career 
On 26 September 2020, Salameh returned to Safa after leaving them in 2016.

Honours 
Ahed
 Lebanese Premier League: 2009–10, 2010–11
 Lebanese FA Cup: 2008–09, 2010–11

Safa
 Lebanese Premier League: 2012–13, 2015–16

Individual
 Lebanese Premier League Team of the Season: 2013–14

References

External links

 
 
 
 

1986 births
Living people
People from Bint Jbeil District
Lebanese footballers
Association football midfielders
Lebanese Premier League players
Safa SC players
Al Ahed FC players
Nejmeh SC players
Racing Club Beirut players
Chabab Ghazieh SC players
Lebanon youth international footballers
Lebanon international footballers
Lebanese expatriate footballers
Expatriate footballers in Iraq
Lebanese expatriate sportspeople in Iraq
Iraqi Premier League players
Naft Maysan FC players
Expatriate footballers in Oman
Lebanese expatriate sportspeople in Oman
Oman Professional League players
Al-Nasr SC (Salalah) players
Najaf FC players